The third season of the FLCL anime series, titled FLCL Alternative, is produced by Production I.G, Toho, and Adult Swim's production arm Williams Street. Alternative was chief directed by Katsuyuki Motohiro and co-directed by Yutaka Uemura, with screenplay by Hideto Iwai. It originally aired from September 8 to October 13, 2018 in the United States on Adult Swim's Toonami programming block. However, the first episode of the season aired unannounced in Japanese audio with English subtitles as part of Adult Swim's April Fools' stunt back on April 1, 2018. In Japan, Alternative received a theatrical screening as a compilation film, with it opening on September 7, 2018. In addition to providing several tracks for the season, The Pillows performed the ending theme song "Star overhead".

In this season, Haruko enters into the life of high school student Kana Koumoto and her friends as she becomes a mentor of sorts to Kana in helping the teen's transition into adulthood as Medical Mechanica begins its assault on Earth.


Episode list

Home media release

Japanese

English

Notes

References

External links
Official Gainax website 
Official Adult Swim website

FLCL episode lists